The M Countdown Chart is a record chart on the South Korean Mnet television music program M Countdown. Every week, the show awards the best-performing single on the chart in the country during its live broadcast.

In 2008, 17 songs ranked number one on the chart and 14 acts received first-place trophies. Six songs collected trophies for three consecutive weeks and achieved a triple crown: "Circus" by MC Mong, "Look Only At Me" by Taeyang, "So Hot" by Wonder Girls, "U-Go-Girl" by Lee Hyori, "Haru Haru" by Big Bang, and "Mirotic" by TVXQ. Girls' Generation acquired the highest point total of the year on the February 28 broadcast, with a score of 965 for "Kissing You".

Chart history

References 

2008 in South Korean music
2008 record charts
Lists of number-one songs in South Korea